Rhinotragus trizonatus is a species of beetle in the family Cerambycidae. It was described by Blanchard in 1832.

References

Rhinotragini
Beetles described in 1832